The 2014–15 TSG 1899 Hoffenheim season was the 116th season in the club's football history. The club played in the Bundesliga, the top tier of German football. It was the club's seventh consecutive season in this league, having been promoted from the 2. Bundesliga in 2008.

First team squad
Squad at end of season

Players out on loan

Transfers

Summer

In

Out

Winter

In

Out

Competitions

Bundesliga

League table

Results summary

Results by round

Matches

DFB-Pokal

Statistics

Appearances and goals

|-
 ! colspan=14 style=background:#dcdcdc; text-align:center| Goalkeepers

 
 
 
|-
 ! colspan=14 style=background:#dcdcdc; text-align:center| Defenders

 
 
 
 
 
 
 
|-
 ! colspan=14 style=background:#dcdcdc; text-align:center| Midfielders

 
 
 
 
 
 
 
|-
 ! colspan=14 style=background:#dcdcdc; text-align:center| Forwards

 
 
 
 
 
 
|-
 ! colspan=14 style=background:#dcdcdc; text-align:center| Players transferred out during the season

Goalscorers
This includes all competitive matches.  The list is sorted by shirt number when total goals are equal.

Last updated on 5 October

References

Hoffenheim
TSG 1899 Hoffenheim seasons